Laurent Madouas (born 8 February 1967 in Rennes) is a French former road cyclist.
His son Valentin is also a cyclist.

Major results

1988
 3rd Overall GP Tell
 10th GP des Amériques
1990
 8th Overall Tour de Suisse
1991
 7th GP Ouest France-Plouay
 7th Trophée des Grimpeurs
 10th GP de la Ville de Rennes
1992
 3rd Japan Cup Cycle Road Race
 3rd Overall Tour Méditerranéen
1993
 3rd GP de Fourmies
 7th Overall Circuit Cycliste Sarthe
1st Stage 1
1994
 1st Cholet-Pays de Loire
 5th Trophée des Grimpeurs
1995
 2nd GP Ouest France-Plouay
 2nd Polynormande
 3rd Road race, National Road Championships
 3rd Overall Route du Sud
 4th Telekom Grand Prix
 7th Overall Tour DuPont
1996
 1st Tour of Sweden
 4th Liège–Bastogne–Liège
 8th Overall Critérium du Dauphiné Libéré
 9th Overall Paris–Nice
1997
 2nd Classique des Alpes
 2nd Grand Prix de Wallonie
 4th GP Ouest France-Plouay
 9th Liège–Bastogne–Liège
1998
 5th Road race, National Road Championships
 7th GP Ouest France-Plouay
 7th Overall Route du Sud
1999
 1st Stage 5 Critérium du Dauphiné Libéré
2000
 8th A Travers le Morbihan

Grand Tour general classification results timeline

References

1967 births
Living people
French male cyclists
Cyclists from Rennes